In 2008, pinyin Yán was estimated to be the 75th most common surname in the People's Republic of China, shared by around 3.1 million citizens, making it the most common of the surnames written “Yan” without tone markers.

The surname 闫 (閆 in traditional), also Yán, was created as a result of the Second round of simplified Chinese characters, in 1977. Although this series of simplifications was soon retracted, some people retained the simplified surname. One source even suggests that 闫 now more common, as it is shared by 3,200,000 people, and the 78th-most common name, compared to 阎, shared by 4,900,000 people, or the 103rd most common name. Both appear on the Hundred Family Surnames poem.

It is derived from the following sources:
 from a fief located around Xihua County, Henan, granted to Zhongyi from King Wu of Zhou. Another source claims the fief was granted by King Kang of Zhou to his eldest son
 from a fief (located around the town of Yanjing in Shanxi) granted to Yi, the prince of Jin during the Spring and Autumn period.

References

Notable people
 阎崇年 Yan Chongnian (born 1934) Chinese historian
 阎芳 Yan Fang, Chinese softball player
 Yan Feng (athlete) Chinese paralympic athlete competing in throwing events
 阎红 Yan Hong, Chinese race walker
 阎连科 Yan Lianke (born 1958), Chinese writer of novels and short stories
 阎肃 Yan Su (1930-2016), Chinese lyricist and screenwriter
 阎森 Yan Sen (born 1975), Chinese table tennis player
 阎世鹏 Yan Shipeng (born 1987), Chinese football player
 阎嵩 Yan Song (footballer) (born 1981), Chinese footballer
 阎维文 Yan Weiwen (born 1957), Chinese opera singer with origins in the People's Liberation Army
 阎相闯 Yan Xiangchuang, Chinese professional footballer
 閻錫山 Yan Xishan (1883–1960), warlord
 阎学通 Yan Xuetong (born 1952), Dean of the Institute of Modern International Relations at Tsinghua University

Individual Chinese surnames